John Gast may refer to:
John Gast (activist) (1772–1837), English shipwright and labour activist
John Gast (baseball) (born 1989), American baseball pitcher
John Gast (priest) (1715–1788) Archdeacon of Glendalough from 1764 to 1788
John Gast (painter) (1842–1896), Prussian-American painter and lithographer best known for American Progress